The 2018–19 Guadeloupe Division of Honor is the 68th season of the Guadeloupe Division of Honor, the top division football competition in Guadeloupe. The season began on 25 August 2018.

League table

References

External links
Ligue Guadeloupéenne de Football

Guadeloupe Division of Honor
Guadeloupe
2018–19 in Guadeloupean football